Grand Hustle Records (formerly Grand Hustle Entertainment), also known as Hustle Gang Music, is an Atlanta, Georgia-based hip hop record label, founded in 2003, by American rapper T.I. and his manager Jason Geter. Up until December 2012, the label was distributed by Atlantic Records. It currently operates as an independent record label. The label has been home to artists such as 8Ball & MJG, B.o.B, Killer Mike, Young Dro, DJ Drama, Meek Mill, Chip, Travis Scott, and Trae tha Truth, the latter of whom also serves as the label's vice president. The label also houses a roster of record producers, which has included Lil' C, Mars and Nard & B, among others.

The label has released 33 studio albums in total, with 14 of them being certified gold or higher by the Recording Industry Association of America (RIAA). Additionally, the label has released six albums that reached number one on the US Billboard 200 chart, namely King (2006), T.I. vs. T.I.P. (2007), Paper Trail (2008), The Adventures of Bobby Ray (2010), Birds in the Trap Sing McKnight (2016) and Astroworld (2018). Furthermore, Grand Hustle has released multiple Top 40 hit singles, including "Bring 'Em Out", "What You Know", "Shoulder Lean", "Dead and Gone", "Airplanes", "Magic", "Strange Clouds", "Both of Us", "Antidote" and more. Among those singles, six of them went on to reach the number one spot on the US Billboard Hot 100 chart – "Whatever You Like", "Live Your Life", "Nothin' on You", "Sicko Mode" and "Highest in the Room".

History

2003–11: Beginnings and various signings
Due to the poor commercial reception of his debut album, I'm Serious, T.I. was released from his Arista Records contract. He then formed Grand Hustle Entertainment and began releasing several mixtapes, with the assistance of DJ Drama. He resurfaced in the summer of 2003, alongside fellow Atlanta rapper and former label-mate Bone Crusher, on the song "Never Scared." His mixtapes and mainstream exposure from "Never Scared", eventually recaptured major label attention and he signed a joint venture deal with Atlantic Records. T.I. released his second album Trap Muzik, on August 19, 2003, through Grand Hustle Records; it debuted at number four and sold 109,000 copies in its first week. It spawned the singles "24s", "Be Easy", "Rubberband Man", and "Let's Get Away". In March 2004, a warrant was issued for T.I.'s arrest after he violated his probation of a 1997 drug conviction. He was sentenced to three years in prison.

From 2002 to 2004, fellow Bankhead-based rapper Alfamega, released several mixtapes, gaining local recognition. In 2005, this led to a deal with T.I.'s Grand Hustle Records. In July 2005, the label released the soundtrack to the film Hustle & Flow. The soundtrack included the song "It's Hard out Here for a Pimp", which won an Academy Award for Best Original Song. Also in 2005, T.I. added American soul singer-songwriter Governor, to the Grand Hustle roster, after Atlantic Records chose T.I. to act as his mentor. Atlantic Records' plan for Governor, who joined Atlantic's roster almost four years prior, was to market him a devotee, or a card-carrying member of T.I.'s "camp.". Atlantic first tried to pair him with renowned record producer Dr. Dre, and then with gangsta rapper 50 Cent. Both plans fell through. In search of quick jolt of street credibility, the label brokered a deal for the singer to join T.I.'s imprint. After appearing on several of DJ Drama's Gangsta Grillz mixtapes, Governor later released his Grand Hustle debut Son of Pain, in September 2006.

By early 2006, T.I. had signed fellow Bankhead-based rapper Young Dro, to the label. Young Dro's signing proved to be successful after the release of the popular single "Shoulder Lean", in the summer of 2006. It had heavy rotation on BET and MTV2, and its cellular phone ringtone sold over 500,000 units. The hit single is featured on Dro's major-label debut Best Thang Smokin', released in late August the same year. In December 2006, the label released Grand Hustle Presents: In da Streetz Volume 4, a compilation album featuring contributions from several Grand Hustle artists including aforementioned newcomers Alfamega, Young Dro and Governor. The compilation's title comes from a mixtape series entitled In da Streetz, that T.I. and his hip hop ensemble Pimp $quad Click (P$C), released in their early careers.

On October 13, 2007, federal authorities arrested T.I. four hours before the BET Hip Hop Awards in Atlanta. He was charged with two felonies — possession of three unregistered machine guns and two silencers, and possession of firearms by a convicted felon. The arrest was made in the parking lot of a downtown shopping center. T.I. was arrested after allegedly trying to purchase the guns from a "cooperating witness" with the Bureau of Alcohol, Tobacco, Firearms and Explosives. According to federal officials, the witness had been cooperating with authorities a few days prior to the T.I. arrest. The witness had been working as T.I.'s bodyguard since July, authorities said.

In May 2008, T.I. signed up-and-coming Atlanta-based musician B.o.B, who signed a joint partnership deal with Grand Hustle and super producer Jim Jonsin's Rebel Rock Entertainment, under Atlantic Records. The deal took place after Atlantic determined that B.o.B could benefit from being introduced to the world by such a well-established artist such as T.I.. B.o.B was later featured on T.I.'s highly acclaimed album Paper Trail (2008), on the track "On Top of the World", which also featured T.I.'s former rival Ludacris. In June 2008, T.I. announced the signing of veteran Southern hip hop duo 8Ball & MJG to Grand Hustle, during his Hot 107-9 Birthday Bash. In December 2008, Killer Mike, whom T.I. previously collaborated with on the 2003 hit single "Never Scared", confirmed he signed a recording contract with Grand Hustle.

In 2008, T.I. also signed Philadelphia-based rapper Meek Mill to Grand Hustle. Although he was offered other record deals, Mill felt collaborating with T.I. was an opportunity of a lifetime and chose his label. Just when things were starting to look up for Mill, a setback occurred. He was arrested, charged with a crime and order to serve seven months in jail. Mill was then released during the early portion of 2009. Due to label boss T.I.'s and Mill's respective legal troubles, Mill was never able to release an album under Grand Hustle and they parted ways in 2010.

In 2008, P$C member AK, also known as AK the Razorman, began to express his discontent with the label and his longtime friend T.I.: In a 2011 interview with Inday, a Grand Hustle marketing promoter, he confirmed AK and Yung L.A. were no longer a part of the label. In May 2009, T.I. dropped rapper Alfamega, who signed in 2005, after reports surfaced of his past as a DEA informant. A short-lived feud between the two later embroiled, with Alfamega releasing a diss track titled "Greenlight", in March 2010.

On September 1, 2010, T.I. and his wife Tameka "Tiny"Cottle, were arrested on drug charges in Los Angeles. The arrest for drug charges led to T.I. being sentenced on October 15, 2010 to 11 months in prison for violating the terms of his probation, specifically for possessing ecstasy, testing positive for opiates and associating with a convicted felon, namely his P$C cohort C-Rod. However, on October 25, the drug charges against T.I. were dropped. On November 1, T.I. reported back to the Forrest City Federal Facility to serve his 11-month sentence. His date of release was set to be September 29, 2011. His seventh album No Mercy, was released on December 7, 2010, during his imprisonment. The album peaked at number four in the US and it sold over 159,000 copies in its first week. RIAA certified No Mercy Gold, with over 500,000 copies sold.

2011–2016: Get Dough or Die series
In 2011, T.I. signed his youngest brother Bryce Harris, better known by his stage name GFM Bryyce. In late 2011, Grand Hustle solo artists Shad da God, Spodee and Yung Booke, came together to form the hip hop group D.O.P.E. (an acronym for Destroying Other People's Egos). D.O.P.E.'s first notable song, titled "Harry Potter" and produced by Hit-Boy, was included on T.I.'s fifth solo mixtape, Fuck da City Up, which was released January 1, 2012. On March 1, 2012, T.I. revealed he signed rappers Iggy Azalea, Chip and Trae tha Truth, to Grand Hustle Records. T.I. was then executive producer on Azalea's debut EP, Glory and was featured on the lead single "Murda Bizness", which premiered March 26, 2012. The EP was later released on July 30, 2012. On October 9, 2012, T.I., Iggy Azalea, B.o.B, Chip and Trae tha Truth, were all featured on the annual BET Hip Hop Awards cypher, where they all took turns rapping, showcasing their abilities. In 2012, Chip, formerly known as Chipmunk, also released his first project with Grand Hustle, a mixtape entitled London Boy. The mixtape, which features several appearances from Grand Hustle artists, including Iggy Azalea and T.I on the posse cut, "Hustle Gang", was released on December 25, 2012. In early January 2013, B.o.B announced an upcoming Grand Hustle compilation album titled Hustle Gang.

On January 18, 2013, it was announced T.I. drew a close to his 10-year contract with Atlantic Records the month before, after releasing Trouble Man: Heavy Is the Head. It was reported he proposed a $75 million deal for any label that wants to provide a home for him and his imprint. TMZ reported that T.I. had drawn up the details, which included exclusive signing of all Grand Hustle artists. T.I. was also allegedly being coaxed by some of the biggest names in the industry. There were reports that Jay-Z was looking to sign T.I., hoping to add him to the Roc Nation roster. T.I. also had an exclusive dinner at Katana with Dr. Dre, who is thought to have proposed an Interscope signing to the rapper. T.I. had also met with Sony, who reportedly offered him $50 Million, and spoke with Universal later that week.

In March 2013, T.I. and B.o.B filmed the music video for "Memories Back Then", a song featuring Kendrick Lamar and Kris Stephens. The song, which was recorded for Trouble Man: Heavy Is the Head, failed to appear on Trouble Man due to sample-clearance issues, it was announced to be being released as the lead single from the upcoming Grand Hustle Presents: Hustle Gang compilation album. The music video for "Memories Back Then", directed by Philly Fly Boy, was released April 22, 2013. The song was then officially released via iTunes the next day. The song has since debuted at #88 on the Billboard Hot 100.

On April 4, T.I. revealed the label would release a mixtape titled, G.D.O.D. (Get Dough or Die), during the first week of May 2013, preceding the compilation album. On April 19, 2013, T.I. formally introduced GOOD Music producer Travis Scott and Grammy Award winning songwriter Kris Stephens, as Grand Hustle signees. On April 28, a release date for the mixtape would later be announced to be May 7, 2013. As promised the mixtape was released on May 7, featuring 20 tracks and contributions from Grand Hustle artists T.I., Mitchelle'l, B.o.B, Young Dro, Big Kuntry King, Trae tha Truth, D.O.P.E., Travis Scott, Chip, Kris Stephens, Mac Boney, Doe B and Shad da God (formerly Rich Kid Shawty). "Problems", "Poppin' 4 Sum", "Kemosabe", and "Here I Go" were released as singles from the mixtape over the following months. In a May 8, 2013 interview, T.I. said that he was in talks of possibly signing American recording artists Yo Gotti, Problem, Jeremih and Kirko Bangz to Grand Hustle.

On December 28, 2013, Glenn Thomas, better known by his stage name Doe B, died after being shot in his home state of Alabama with Mike Feez. His manager DJ Frank White confirmed Doe B's death via Twitter. In February 2014, Grand Hustle collaborated with DJ Whoo Kid, DJ Skee and DJ MLK, to release the compilation mixtape SXEW Vol. 1: The Grand Hustle, the trio's annual SXSW inspired mixtape. The mixtape features appearances from T.I., Young Dro, Trae Tha Truth, Iggy Azalea and Doe B, the latter of which is featured on a song with T.I. and American rapper Raekwon, titled "I Wanna Know".

In an August 2014 interview with MTV, T.I. revealed plans to release the Grand Hustle compilation, which is tentatively due in December, following Paperwork: "What's holding up the Hustle Gang project is that we have some new additions to the mix, and we didn't wanna put out the project out without including or allowing those new additions to be part of it. Maybe we'll do a stroke of midnight release on New Years. We did that with F**k Da City Up and it did well, so maybe we'll try that again." On September 19, 2014, the label released the second installment to the G.D.O.D. (Get Dough or Die) series. Aside from Grand Hustle recording artists, the mixtape features additional appearances from Iggy Azalea, Meek Mill, Young Thug, Troy Ave, Watch The Duck, Yo Gotti, Trey Songz and Rich Homie Quan, among others.

In March 2015, it was announced the OMG Girlz, the musical trio that included T.I.'s stepdaughter, was officially disestablished. In August 2015, D.O.P.E. member Spodee, announced he was no longer under Grand Hustle; during an interview he stated "Everybody know I was a loyal guy with Grand Hustle and Tip. And, you know, it's no bad blood. I'm not mad at Tip or anything like that, but I have the potential to be bigger than Tip or if not, just as big. So it was time, man. I outgrew that. [I was with Grand Hustle] for too long. Six years." In response, T.I. commented "As we all go about our business and pleasure on this fine day today, allow me to remind you of two former young hopeful Grand Hustlers, who thought going against the glory and good graces of [the family] might be more beneficial to their campaign", referring to Yung L.A. and DG Yola.

In September 2015, Travis Scott released his debut studio album Rodeo, under Grand Hustle and Epic Records. The album was supported by two singles, "3500" and "Antidote", the latter of which reached number 16 on the US Billboard Hot 100 chart and was certified platinum by the RIAA for sales over 1,000,000 digital downloads. In July 2016, Grand Hustle released a song under the namesake Hustle Gang, titled "40 Acres", featuring T.I. alongside fellow Atalnta-based rappers RaRa and Rossi.

On September 19, 2016, Grand Hustle released the compilation H.G.O.E. (Hustle Gang Over Errrrythang), featuring guest appearances from Young Thug, Chocolate Droppa, Future, Migos, B.o.B, London Jae, Young Dro, Trae tha Truth, Lotto Savage, Shad da God, Kap G and more.

2017–present: We Want Smoke
In April 2017, American rappers Tokyo Jetz, RaRa, Translee and London Jae, were all revealed to be new members of the Grand Hustle roster.

On March 15, 2017, T.I. announced the Hustle Gang concert tour. The Grand Hustle tour began on April 26 in Mobile, Alabama, going through 36 shows across the country before they wrapped up on June 11 in Jacksonville, Florida. In late March, Hustle Gang hosted an after-hours brunch and vibe event, at South by Southwest (SXSW), titled The Hustle Gang Experience, powered by Beer N Tacos & Chariot. Headed by T.I. and Trae Tha Truth, the showcase gave a platform for the new Hustle Gang roster to show their skills. The night kicked off with a performance by T.I.'s son, Domani Harris, with music from his recently released project Constellation, followed by RaRa with songs such as "FWM" off his debut project I Am What I Am. Tokyo Jetz went on to perform her viral hit "DM", Yung Booke and London Jae performed "H.I.T.V." and finishing with Trae Tha Truth performing records like "Swangin" and new music from T.I.'s forthcoming album.

On June 28, 2017, a song titled "Game 7" was released as the first single from Grand Hustle's compilation album We Want Smoke. The song features verses from T.I., RaRa and Rossi. The album's second single "Do No Wrong", was released in July and features verses from GFMBRYYCE, Young Dro and T.I. The album's third single "Friends", was released with an accompanying music video, on September 8. "Friends" features Hustle Gang rappers T.I., RaRa, Brandon Rossi, Tokyo Jetz, Trae tha Truth and Young Dro.

In an October 2017 interview with HipHopDX, when asked about Grand Hustle Records' upcoming albums, T.I. answered with: "We Want Smoke is out, and then Translee is coming out on November 27th, and Booke is October 27th, and you can wait until December 18th for mine. Just know that whenever you see The Chief [logo] on the project, it's gonna be absolute pandemonium. It gonna go hamburger."

Artists

Current acts

Former acts

Publishing deals
Throughout the years, Grand Hustle Records has signed multiple artists (often in their respective early careers) to publishing deals. The following list documents notable artists who had signed such a contract at one point or another.

 Iggy Azalea
 Kris Stephens
 Spot
 Zuse

Branches

Hustle Gang 

Hustle Gang is an American hip hop collective composed of signees of Grand Hustle, introduced in 2013. The group's debut LP, GDOD: Get Dough or Die was released the same year and co-released by record label Be Music. The group's 2017 releases were distributed by Roc Nation.

Smash Factory 

Smash Factory was a production team composed of T.I., and Grand Hustle in-house producers, Lamar Edwards (known as Mars or MyGuyMars) and C Gutta (also known as Lil' C). The group has produced for the likes of Nelly and Young Dro.

VisionMob 
VisionMob is a banner under Grand Hustle in which T.I. directs and or produces music videos.

In-house producers 
Grand Hustle Records also house a production wing, which serves as a group of in-house producers for the label.

Current
 Aldrin "DJ Toomp" Davis – known for producing T.I.'s hit singles "24's", "Be Easy", "U Don't Know Me" and "What You Know".
 Cordale "Lil' C" Quinn – known for producing Young Dro's "Shoulder Lean" and "Rubberband Banks", Young Jeezy's "My Hood" and T.I.'s "Wit Me".
 DJ MLK – Grand Hustle's resident disc jockey.
 Keith Mack – known for producing Ludacris' "Act a Fool" and several T.I. tracks, including the 2006 single "Live in the Sky".
 Kevin "Khao" Cates – known for producing T.I.'s hit single "Why You Wanna", among other tracks for T.I. and other popular hip hop artists.
 Lamar "Mars" Edwards – a member of production team 1500 or Nothin', known for producing Asher Roth's "G.R.I.N.D (Get Ready It's a New Day)" and T.I.'s "Love This Life", among other songs from prominent artists.
 Smash Factory – production team composed of T.I., Lil' C and Mars. They have produced songs such as "I Can't Help It" by T.I., "She's So Fly" by Nelly and "King on Set" by T.I., the latter of which was featured on the More than a Game soundtrack.
 Two Band Geeks – production duo composed of Elliot Stroud and Billy Kang. Production credits include "I Know You Missed Me" by T.I., "Stand Up" by D.O.P.E. and more. Elliot Stroud contributes solo production under the pseudonym 'Everybody Knows Stroud.'
 TrackSlayerz – production duo composed of Dexter "INF" Randall and Demetri "Price" Duncan. Known for producing songs such as T.I.'s "I'm Back", Jim Jones' "Pulling Me Back" and Yung Joc's "Posted at da Store", among others.

Former
 DJ Drama (2006–2011) – former resident disc jockey for the label
 Nard & B (2007–2016) – production duo composed of Bernard "Nard" Rosser and Brandon "B" Rackley. Known for producing several songs, including Yung L.A.'s "Futuristic Love (Elroy)", Slim Thug's "So High", and co-producing Maino's "All the Above", with high-profile producer Just Blaze.

Personnel
 Clifford "Tip" Harris, Jr. – chief executive officer (CEO)
 Jason Geter – co-CEO, president
 Trae tha Truth – vice president (VP)
 Doug Peterson – VP of artists and repertoire (A&R)
 Hannah Kang – general manager
 Inday – marketing promoter
 Joe McLaren – artist development, engineer

Discography
 All releases distributed by Atlantic Records until December 2012, unless otherwise noted.

Studio albums

Compilation albums

EPs

References

External links
 

T.I.
Record labels established in 2003
American record labels
American hip hop record labels
Vanity record labels
Gangsta rap record labels
Contemporary R&B record labels
Music production companies
Music publishing companies of the United States